Bo Gunnar Rickardsson Hägglöf (12 December 1904 – 12 January 1994) was a Swedish diplomat, in 1939 briefly cabinet member, then head of the foreign ministry's bureau for foreign trade during World War II, after the war participating in the preparations of the United Nations' 1947 UN Partition Plan of Palestine, then ambassador to London 1948–1967 and Paris 1967–1971.

Gunnar Hägglöf has published several books, chiefly popularizing Sweden's World War II history for domestic and foreign readers. In his books, and also in accounts by other authors, Hägglöf appears as an outspoken critic of the idealist policies of Foreign Minister Sandler and Activist advocates for Sweden's military engagement for the defence of Finland after the Soviet attacks in 1939 (the Winter War) and 1941 (the Continuation War).

Although Hägglöf in policy matter was closer to left-leaning neutralist Social Democrats, led by Ernst Wigforss, he doesn't spare retrospect criticism on that circle's pro-Soviet sentiments, and particularly the policies of Foreign Minister Undén's (1945–1962), that in Hägglöf's view was based on an exaggeratedly rosy perception of the Soviet Union.

Contrary to many other writers on the subject, Hägglöf also makes a point of  reminding readers of the Allies' disrespect for neutral countries during a war that they perceived as a fight of life and death; and how openly discussed plans for an Allied invasion of Scandinavia was a chief reason for Nazi Germany to launch a preventive invasion (Operation Weserübung) in April 1940.

Gunnar Hägglöf was in the service of the Swedish government for all of his life. However, without doubt, his most critical achievements were during World War II, when he and associated negotiators managed to gain the confidence of both German and British counterparts, which ensured the enclosed Sweden a considerably improved supply of food and other necessities than during World War I.

Awards and decorations
   Commander Grand Cross of the Order of the Polar Star (5 June 1954)

References

1904 births
1994 deaths
Permanent Representatives of Sweden to the United Nations
Honorary Knights Grand Cross of the Royal Victorian Order
Ambassadors of Sweden to Belgium
Ambassadors of Sweden to the Netherlands
Ambassadors of Sweden to the Soviet Union
Ambassadors of Sweden to the United Kingdom
Ambassadors of Sweden to France
People from Helsingborg
Commanders Grand Cross of the Order of the Polar Star